Ilkhaniabad (also Romanized as Īlkhānīābād) is a village in Gamasiyab Rural District, in the Central District of Sahneh County, Kermanshah Province, Iran. At the 2006 census, its population was 375, in 82 families.

References 

Populated places in Sahneh County